Zavišinė (formerly) is a village in Kėdainiai district municipality, in Kaunas County, in central Lithuania. According to the 2011 census, the village had a population of 8 people. There is a former manor park.

Zavišinė formerly was a manor of the Zavišos family. Later it was transferred to the Jankauskai family, there was a distillery.

Demography

References

Villages in Kaunas County
Kėdainiai District Municipality